The 1958 Vermont Catamounts football team was an American football team that represented  the University of Vermont in the Yankee Conference during the 1958 NCAA College Division football season. In their seventh year under head coach J. Edward Donnelly, the team compiled a 2–4–1 record.

Schedule

References

Vermont
Vermont Catamounts football seasons
Vermont Catamounts football